Aden Isaq Ahmed or Aden Isaaq Ahmed (born 1923) was a Somali politician of the former Somali Republic.

History 
Aden born in Awdal in 1923, he belonged to the Rer Ahamed (Reer Axamed), Gibril Yunus (Jibril Yoonis), Makahiil (Makahiil) section of the Gadabursi (Gadabuursi) or Samaron (Samaroon) clan. He served his country the Somali Republic as a Senior Diplomat in Moscow and was the second Somali man ever to set foot in the Russian capital. After arriving back in Somalia he took part in the elections to become a minister of parliament. He succeeded and served as the Minister of Defense, Minister of Transportation & Communication, Minister of Education. Prior to that he studied at the University of Oxford.

Career 
 First Secretary (Senior Diplomat) under the Somali Ambassador of Moscow (1961–1963)
 Minister of Defence (1964–1966)
 Minister of Transportation & Communication (1966–1967)
 Minister of Public Education (1967–1969)
 Acting Prime Minister of Somalia (1969)
 Somali Ambassador in Pakistan (1977–1984)
 Somali Ambassador in Oman (1985–1988)

References

1923 births
Possibly living people
Alumni of the University of Oxford
Somalian politicians
Gadabuursi
People from Awdal